Asadiyeh (also Romanized as Asadīyeh) is a city in the Central District of Darmian County, South Khorasan province, Iran, and serves as capital of the county. At the 2006 census, its population was 4,312 in 969 households. The following census in 2011 counted 5,804 people in 1,330 households. The latest census in 2016 showed a population of 5,460 people in 1,383 households.

References 

Darmian County

Cities in South Khorasan Province

Populated places in South Khorasan Province

Populated places in Darmian County